The Volvo LV76-79 was a light truck produced by Swedish automaker Volvo between 1934 and 1940.

History
In 1934 Volvo introduced its LV76 series. The truck was available in three versions: LV76 with a payload of 1 tonne, LV77 with a payload of 1.25 tonnes and LV78 with a payload of 1.5 tonnes. In 1935 the truck was modernized with a streamlined radiator cover and the larger EC engine.

In 1936 the series was supplemented with the sturdier LV79.

Engines

References

External links 

 Volvo Trucks Global - history
 Swedish brass cars - picture gallery

LV76
Vehicles introduced in 1934